HMCS Chignecto was a  that served in the Royal Canadian Navy during the Second World War. She only saw service on the west coast of Canada during the war. She was named for Chignecto Bay. The vessel's fate is unknown.

Design and description
They came in two versions powered by different engines; those with a diesel engines and those with vertical triple-expansion steam engines. Chignecto was of the latter design and was larger than her diesel-engined cousins. She had a complement of 6 officers and 77 enlisted.

Chignecto had two vertical triple-expansion steam engines, each driving one shaft, using steam provided by two Admiralty three-drum boilers.

Chignecto was originally armed with a single quick-firing (QF) /40 caliber Mk IV gun mounted forward that was later replaced with a 12-pounder 12 cwt HA gun. For anti-aircraft purposes, the minesweepers were equipped with one quick-firing (QF) 2-pounder Mark VIII and up to three single-mounted QF 20 mm Oerlikon guns. As a convoy escort, Chignecto was deployed with 40 depth charges launched from two depth charge throwers and four chutes.

Service history
Chignecto was ordered 23 February 1940 as part of the 1939–1940 building programme. The minesweeper's keel was laid down on 9 November 1940 by North Van Ship Repair at North Vancouver and the ship was launched on 12 December later that year. She was commissioned into the Royal Canadian Navy on 31 October 1941.

Following her commissioning, Chignecto was assigned to Esquimalt Force for local patrol and minesweeping duties. She spent the entire war on the west coast alternating between service with Esquimalt Force and Prince Rupert Force. She was paid off from the Royal Canadian Navy on 3 November 1945. In 1946 Chignecto was sold to the Union Steamship Co. of British Columbia. She was to have been converted to a coastal merchant ship however the conversion was not proceeded with. The fate of the vessel is in dispute. The Miramar Ship Index claims the vessel was broken up in 1949. Macpherson and Barrie traced the ship to 1951 in a purchase order from a San Francisco firm. Colledge claims the ship was possibly resold in 1952.

See also
 List of ships of the Canadian Navy

References

Notes

Citations

Sources
 
 
 
 

Bangor-class minesweepers of the Royal Canadian Navy
Ships built in British Columbia
1940 ships
World War II minesweepers of Canada